Richard Swift (1811 – 24 March 1872) was an Irish Independent Irish Party politician.

Swift was elected Independent Irish Party MP for Sligo County at the 1852 general election and held the seat until 1857 when he was defeated, ending fourth and last in that year's poll.

References

External links
 

1811 births
1872 deaths
Irish Conservative Party MPs
Members of the Parliament of the United Kingdom for County Sligo constituencies (1801–1922)
UK MPs 1852–1857